Mohamed Omar is a mathematician interested in combinatorics, and algebra. Omar is currently an Associate Professor of Mathematics and the Joseph B. Platt Chair in Effective Teaching at Harvey Mudd College.

Early life and education 
Omar was born in Alexandria, Egypt to an Egyptian mother and an Ethiopian father, but was raised in Toronto, Canada. 

He attended the University of Waterloo, where he received a bachelor's double degree in pure mathematics and combinatorics & optimization in 2006, followed by a master's degree in combinatorics & optimization in 2007. Omar's master's thesis was titled "Combinatorial Approaches to the Jacobian Conjecture" and was advised by Ian P. Goulden. 

Omar then attended graduate school in the mathematics department at the University of California Davis. He completed his Ph.D. in mathematics in 2011. Omar's doctoral advisor was Jesús A. De Loera, and his dissertation was titled "Applications of Convex and Algebraic Geometry to Graphs and Polytopes".

Career 
After completion of his doctorate, Omar became the Harry Bateman Research Instructor at the California Institute of Technology. In the fall of 2013 Omar moved to Harvey Mudd College and took a position as tenure track faculty in the mathematics department, where he has worked to this day.

Beyond the classroom, Omar has been involved in numerous outreach efforts to promote diversity in Science, Technology, Engineering and Mathematics (STEM) fields, as well as mathematical enrichment for high school students. He has participated in the Bridge to Enter Advanced Mathematics (BEAM) program as an instructor. Omar has also served as faculty at the Canada/USA Mathcamp, and eventually served on the board of directors for the Mathematics Foundation of America, which organizes the camp.  

Omar's work in promoting diversity has been written about in Forbes Magazine, and he has been a guest on the Scientific American podcast "My Favorite Theorem". He also maintains a Youtube channel where he posts videos about advanced mathematical concepts as well as videos aimed at helping young students prepare for standardized tests.

Honors and awards 

Omar has received several awards for the quality of his teaching. In the 2013-2014 academic year, he was awarded the Associated Students of the California Institute of Technology (ASCIT) Teaching Award. In 2018, the Mathematical Association of America awarded him the Henry L. Alder Award. In 2020, Omar was selected as a fellow in the 2020 Inaugural Class of Karen EDGE Fellows. Omar was also recognized by Mathematically Gifted & Black as a Black History Month 2017 Honoree. He was awarded the Inaugural AMS Claytor-Gilmer Fellowship in 2021.

References

External links 
 Homepage
 
 

Living people
Year of birth missing (living people)
University of California, Davis alumni
Harvey Mudd College faculty
21st-century Canadian mathematicians
People from Alexandria